Aguadulce Airport  is an airport serving the city of Aguadulce in Coclé Province, Panama.

The runway is adjacent to the west side of the city. There is a dirt road crossing the runway midfield.

See also

 Transport in Panama
 List of airports in Panama

References

External links
 OurAirports - Aguadulce Airport
 OpenStreetMap - Aguadulce
 HERE Maps - Aguadulce
 Aguadulce Airport

Airports in Panama
Coclé Province